The Remix Album is an album by Champion, released in 2006 on Saboteur Records. The album collects remixes by various Canadian musicians of tracks from Champion's 2004 debut album Chill'em All.

The album was nominated for Dance Recording of the Year at the 2007 Juno Awards, but lost to Tiga's album Sexor.

Track listing

DJ Champion albums
2006 remix albums